The Shearplace Hill Enclosure is an archaeological site of the Bronze Age, about  south-west of Cerne Abbas in Dorset, England. It is a scheduled monument.

Description
It is a Martin Down style enclosure, named after the Bronze Age enclosure on Martin Down in Hampshire. Sites of this type, interpreted as domestic settlements, have mostly been found on downland of central southern England, usually situated on hillsides.

There was excavation in 1958 by Philip Rahtz. He established that there was a farmstead of several enclosures, the principal enclosure containing two round houses; and that it was occupied from the Middle to Late Bronze Age, when it was abandoned. Finds included pottery of the Deverel–Rimbury culture, loom weights, flint scrapers and animal bones.

References

Scheduled monuments in Dorset
Bronze Age sites in Dorset
Archaeological sites in Dorset